Oil Pollution Act of 1961, 33 U.S.C. Chapter 20 §§ 1001-1011, established judicial definitions and coastal prohibitions for the United States maritime industry. The Act invoked the accords of the International Convention for the Prevention of the Pollution of the Sea by Oil, 1954. The international agreement provided provisions to control the discharge of fossil fuel pollutants from nautical vessels on the high seas.

The S. 2187 legislation was passed by the United States 87th Congressional session and enacted by the 35th President of the United States John F. Kennedy on August 30, 1961.

History
The International Convention for the Prevention of Pollution of the Sea by Oil (OILPOL) was an international convention organized by the United Kingdom in 1954. The convention was held in London, England from April 26, 1954 to May 12, 1954. The international meeting was convened to acknowledge the disposal of harmful waste which posed endangerment to the marine ecosystems.

The International Convention for the Prevention of the Pollution of the Sea by Oil, 1954 original text was penned in English and French. The 1954 international agreement was amended in 1962, 1969, and 1971.

Provisions of the Act
The Act emulated the subsequent formalities of the International Convention for the Prevention of the Pollution of the Sea by Oil, 1954.

Definitions
Discharge in relation to oil or to an oily mixture means any discharge or escape howsoever caused
Heavy diesel oil means marine diesel oil, other than those distillates of which more than fifty percent by volume distils at a temperature not exceeding 340 °C / 644 °F when tested by American Society for Testing and Materials standard method D158-53
Mile means a nautical mile of 
Oil means persistent oils, such as crude oil, fuel oil, heavy diesel oil, and lubricating oil. The oil in an oil mixture is less than one hundred parts per one million parts of the oil mixture, and is not deemed to foul the surface of the sea
Prohibited zones means four designated zones described as Adriatic zones, North Sea zones, Atlantic zones, and Australian zone
Ship means
(I) ships for the time being used as naval auxiliaries;
(II) ships of under five hundred tons gross tonnage;
(III) ships for the time being engaged in the whaling industry;
(IV) ships for the time being navigating the Great Lakes of North America and their connecting and tributary waters as far east as the lower exit of the Lachine Canal Montreal in the Province of Quebec, Canada.
Secretary means the Secretary of the United States Army

Zone Prohibitions
Belgium
Denmark
Federal Republic of Germany
Netherlands
United Kingdom of Great Britain and Northern Ireland
but not beyond the point where the limit of a  zone off the west coast of Jutland intersects the limit of the  zone off the coast of Norway.
Atlantic Zones - Atlantic zone shall be within a line drawn from a point on the Greenwich meridian  in a north-north-easterly direction from the Shetland Islands; thence northwards along the Greenwich meridian to latitude 64° north; thence westwards along the 64th parallel to longitude 10° west; thence to latitude 60° north, longitude 14° west; thence to latitude 54° 30' north, longitude 30° west; thence to latitude 44° 20' north, longitude 30° west; thence to latitude 48° north, longitude 14° west; thence eastwards along the 48th parallel to a point of intersection with the  zone off the coast of France.

Oil Record Book
There shall be carried in every ship an oil record book. In the event of such discharge or escape of oil from a ship in a prohibited zone, a signed statement shall be made in the oil record book, by the officer or officers in charge of the operations concerned and by the master of the ship, of the circumstances of and reason for the discharge or escape.

Repeal of Oil Pollution Act of 1961
The 1961 United States statute was repealed by the enactment of Act to Prevent Pollution from Ships on October 21, 1980.

See also

Ballast tank
Ballast water discharge and the environment
Environmental impact of shipping
International Maritime Organization
MARPOL 73/78
Oil discharge monitoring equipment
Oil Pollution Act of 1924
Oil Pollution Act of 1973
Oil Pollution Act of 1990

References

External links

 
 

87th United States Congress
1961 in the environment
1961 in American law
Ocean pollution
United States federal environmental legislation